Wacław Grzybowski (1887-1959) was a Polish politician and philosopher. He was a Deputy to the Polish Sejm from 1927 to 1935, and ambassador to the Soviet Union (Moscow) from July 1936 to 17 September 1939. He was summoned and given a note cancelling agreements with Poland prior to its invasion of Poland. Grzybowski refused to accept the note and then emigrated.

References

1887 births
1959 deaths
Ambassadors of Poland to the Soviet Union
Polish politicians
Diplomats of the Second Polish Republic
Ambassadors of Poland to Czechoslovakia